John Washburn could refer to:

John Washburn (American colonist), 17th-Century emigrant from England to the Plymouth Colony, see C.P. Washburn Grain Mill
John Hosea Washburn, American chemist and college president.
John L. Washburn, U.S. government official and United Nations official